Monroe Township is one of the fourteen townships of Holmes County, Ohio, United States. As of the 2010 census the population was 1,573, up from 1,401 in 2000.

Geography
Located in the west central part of the county, it borders the following townships:
Ripley Township - north
Prairie Township - northeast
Hardy Township - east
Killbuck Township - southeast
Richland Township - southwest
Knox Township - west

No municipalities are located in Monroe Township.

Name and history
It is one of twenty-two Monroe Townships statewide.

Government
The township is governed by a three-member board of trustees, who are elected in November of odd-numbered years to a four-year term beginning on the following January 1. Two are elected in the year after the presidential election and one is elected in the year before it. There is also an elected township fiscal officer, who serves a four-year term beginning on April 1 of the year after the election, which is held in November of the year before the presidential election. Vacancies in the fiscal officership or on the board of trustees are filled by the remaining trustees.

References

External links
County website

Townships in Holmes County, Ohio
Townships in Ohio